Superheroes Are Everywhere is a children's book written by Vice President of the United States and former Senator Kamala Harris and illustrated by Mechal Renee Roe. It was published on January 8, 2019.

Contents
The book teaches that superheroes can be found everywhere in real life, from family members, to friends, to teachers at school and college, based upon the author's life.

Reception
Booklist said that the book "offers a solid message: a superhero could be anyone, including you [the reader]." Likewise, Common Sense Media called it an "encouraging, uplifting book [that] inspires kids to recognize the superheroes all around them and promise to be, like them, brave, kind, helpful, and more."

Misinformation about distribution
An April 24, 2021 New York Post cover story by Laura Italiano falsely claimed that the book was being distributed to immigrant children in a shelter in Long Beach, California in "welcome kits."  The story was later debunked - the facility has one copy of the book that was donated to its library. Chair of the Republican National Committee Ronna McDaniel, Colorado Congresswoman Lauren Boebert, and Arkansas Senator Tom Cotton promoted the rumor and suggested that Harris may have profited from the situation at the expense of taxpayers. As a result of the controversy, Italiano confirmed that she had deliberately written a false story and resigned.

Financial windfall
According to White House Financial Disclosures, Harris earned more than $130,000 in royalties for Superheroes Are Everywhere during the year 2021. These royalties were reported as gross income on Harris's Office of Government Ethics Form 278e. The royalty income is in addition to her $235,100 annual salary as Vice President of the United States.

References

External links

Reading by Senator Harris on YouTube 

2019 children's books
American picture books
Books by Kamala Harris
English-language books
Philomel Books books